Marc Baylis (born 3 April 1977) is a British stage, television and film actor. He trained at Mountview Academy of Theatre Arts, where he was awarded the Stage Scholarship. He is best known for his role as Rob Donovan in Coronation Street from 2012 to 2014, to which he returned for guest appearances in 2015, 2016 and 2017.

Theatre

His stage work includes playing Courtall in the 2011 London revival of Hannah Cowley's The Belle's Stratagem at the Playhouse Theatre, Southwark, directed by Jessica Swale. Michael Billington (The Guardian) heralded it "eminently revivable"; and Libby Purves (The Times) commented "Theatrical enterprise like this makes you proud to be British".

In 2010, Baylis was in Jez Butterworth's multi-award-winning production of Jerusalem at the Apollo Theatre. The production was directed by Ian Rickson and starred Mark Rylance as Johnny "Rooster" Byron and Mackenzie Crook as Ginger.

Other theatre productions include Sonia Friedman's Prick Up Your Ears (Harold Pinter Theatre) directed by Daniel Kramer; King Arthur (Arcola Theatre) directed by John Terry and Mike Bartlett; Futures (Theatre 503); and Hamlet and The Tempest, both for Thelma Holt and the Theatre Royal, Plymouth.

Television
On screen Baylis made his television debut in 2001 playing the young Albert Finney in My Uncle Silas. He has also  played various roles in Channel 4's Sirens, The Bill, EastEnders, Doctors and Hollyoaks.

On 3 May 2012, it was announced Baylis had joined the cast of Coronation Street as Rob Donovan, the younger brother of Carla Connor. He made his first on-screen appearance on 9 July 2012. It was announced in June 2014 that Baylis would be leaving the role of Rob in Coronation Street. The character was written out on 5 November 2014; due to his character receiving a 25-year prison sentence for the murder of Tina McIntyre. In August 2015, it was revealed that Baylis was to reprise his role as Rob later in the year, despite the fact his character was still in prison. He departed for a second time in January 2016, and made a surprise return to Coronation Street in April 2017; having escaped from prison.

Other appearances
Baylis appears in the music video for the song "Propane Nightmares" by Australian drum and bass group, Pendulum, released in 2008.
He has also starred in short films most notably My Dad Marie.

Filmography

Film

Television

Awards and nominations

References

External links 

1978 births
Living people
English male stage actors
English male television actors
English male film actors
Male actors from Worcestershire
People from Stourport-on-Severn